TJ Desná is a association football club based in Desná, Czech Republic. It plays in lower amateur tiers.

History
TJ Desná was established in 1946. The club is currently based in Desná in the Jablonec nad Nisou District in Czech Republic. The team play in I.B Class competition. In 2006–07, the team got into the round 2 of the Czech Cup.

Infrastructure
The training ground is in gymnasium of Desná primary school and in Městský areál Desná.

References

External links

1946 establishments in Czechoslovakia
Association football clubs established in 1946
Football clubs in the Czech Republic